Lewis Macha (born 22 February 1992) is a Zambian footballer who plays as a forward.

Club career

Choma Rangers
Macha joined Rangers in 2010. He scored his first goal on 24 April 2010, a winning goal in the 86th minute in a 3--2 win over Red Arrows. Rangers finished 12th on the log.

Nchanga Rangers
Macha joined Rangers in 2011. He scored his first goal in the 36th minute in a 1--1 draw against Green Eagles. He finished 4th with Rangers.

References

External links
 
 

1992 births
Living people
Association football forwards
Kaizer Chiefs F.C. players
Zambian footballers
Zambian expatriate footballers
Zambia international footballers
Nchanga Rangers F.C. players
Zanaco F.C. players
UD Songo players
Clube Ferroviário de Maputo footballers
Baroka F.C. players
Royal Eagles F.C. players
ZESCO United F.C. players
South African Premier Division players
National First Division players
Zambian expatriate sportspeople in South Africa
Zambian expatriate sportspeople in Mozambique
Expatriate soccer players in South Africa
Expatriate footballers in Mozambique